Klaus Konzorr (born 22 September 1940) is a German diver. He competed at the 1964 Summer Olympics, the 1968 Summer Olympics, and the 1972 Summer Olympics.

References

1940 births
Living people
German male divers
Olympic divers of the United Team of Germany
Olympic divers of West Germany
Divers at the 1964 Summer Olympics
Divers at the 1968 Summer Olympics
Divers at the 1972 Summer Olympics
Sportspeople from Gdańsk
20th-century German people